The Silver Award is the second highest award of the Girl Scouts of the USA, and the highest award that a Girl Scout Cadette can earn.

History

The Silver Award was first introduced in 1980 at the National Program Conferences, launching alongside the updated Gold Award. Requirements for the Silver Award, the Gold Award, and the new Cadette and Senior badges were first found in the book "You Make the Difference: Handbook for Cadette and Senior Girl Scouts," published in June 1980.

Prerequisites

A girl must be in 6th, 7th or 8th grade (or equivalent), be a registered Girl Scout Cadette, and have completed a Cadette Journey before she can begin work on a Silver Award project.

Cadette Journey

There are currently seven Cadette Journey programs to choose from. All badges in the Journey must be earned for the Journey to be complete.

Cadette Amaze Journey (three badges, sold as a set)
Interact
Diplomat
Peacemaker
Cadette Breath Journey (three badges, sold as a set)
Aware
Alert
Affirm
Cadette MEdia Journey (three badges, sold as a set)
Monitor
Influence
Cultivate
Cadette Outdoor Journey (four badges, sold separately)
Night Owl
Trailblazing
Primitive Camper
Cadette Take Action
Cadette Think Like an Engineer Journey (two badges, sold separately)
Cadette Think Like an Engineer Journey Award
Cadette Take Action
Cadette Think Like a Programmer Journey (two badges, sold separately)
Cadette Think Like a Programmer Journey Award
Cadette Take Action
Cadette Think Like a Citizen Scientist Journey (two badges, sold separately)
Cadette Think Like a Citizen Scientist Journey Award
Cadette Take Action

Silver Award Steps

 Identify an issue you care about.
 Build your Girl Scout Silver Award team or decide to go solo.
 Explore your community.
 Pick your Silver Award project.
 Develop your project.
 Make a plan and put it into motion.
 Reflect, share your story, and celebrate.

Silver Award Project

The Silver Award Project can be done as an individual or as a small group (2-4).  Each Girl Scout is expected to contribute 50 hours to the project.  The project is to be girl-led, but adults can advise and assist when necessary.  Although the general guidelines have been established by GSUSA, it is important to check with the local Council on exact procedure.

Approval

The approval process varies by council. Before beginning work on a Take Action Project or a Silver Project, it is important to check with the local council.

See also

Gold Award (Girl Scouts of the USA)
Bronze Award (Girl Scouts of the USA)

References

External links
 Girl Scout Central's Guide to Earning the Silver Award

Scout and Guide awards
Girl Scouts of the USA